Tamara Bojat (born 11 April 1997) is a Montenegrin footballer who plays as a forward and has appeared for the Montenegro women's national team.

Career
Bojat has been capped for the Montenegro national team, appearing for the team during the 2019 FIFA Women's World Cup qualifying cycle.

References

External links
 
 
 

1997 births
Living people
Montenegrin women's footballers
Montenegro women's international footballers
Women's association football forwards